Constantine is one of the 58 provinces (wilayas) of Algeria, whose capital is  the city of the same name.

History
In 1984 Mila Province was carved out of its territory.

Administrative divisions
The province is divided into 6 districts or daïra, which are subdivided into 12 communes or municipalities.

List of districts

References

 
Provinces of Algeria
States and territories established in 1974